Zhetigen (Jetıgen, جەتٸگەن; , Zhetygen) is a small town in Almaty Region of Kazakhstan. It is located some 50 km north of Almaty, on the Turksib rail line.

Accident 

The 600th Guards Air Base of the Kazakh Air Force is located at an airfield near Zhetigen.
An airforce plane crashed near the town in 2008.

References 

Populated places in Almaty Region